The Ekwan River is a river in Kenora District in northwestern Ontario, Canada. It appears as Equam on Bellin map of 1744. Ekwan River is of Cree origin, meaning "the river far up the coast".

Course
The Ekwan drainage basin lies between and is enveloped by the larger ones of neighbouring rivers, the Winisk River on the north and the Attawapiskat River on the south.

Then, within , three named tributaries join: the Matateto River from the right; the Crooked River from the right; and the Little Ekwan River from the left.

Economy
Mining exploration has taken place on the upper reaches of the river.

Tributaries
Little Ekwan River (left)
Crooked River (right)
Matateto River (right)
North Washagami River (left)

See also
List of rivers of Ontario

References

Rivers of Kenora District
Tributaries of James Bay